The Western Collegiate Lacrosse League (WCLL) is a conference that participates in the Men's Collegiate Lacrosse Association (MCLA).  The WCLL operates in California, Nevada, and Oregon and is split into two divisions, Division I and Division II. The conference is governed by an executive board and the teams that win the conference's divisional playoffs receive automatic bids to the MCLA National Tournament.

History

California Lacrosse Association Era (1959-1979) 
The roots of the WCLL go back to 1959 when the California Lacrosse Association (CLA) was created.  This was a hybrid organization that included both college and men's club teams in Southern California.  Similarly, the teams in Northern California participated in the Northern California Lacrosse Association (NCLA).  The founding members of the CLA included Claremont, Los Angeles Lacrosse Club, Orange County Lacrosse Club, San Fernando Valley Lacrosse Club, OMBAC, San Marino Lacrosse Club and others.
In 1969, UCLA joined the league, followed by UCSB in 1970.

In 1976, the CLA expanded with the addition of Southern California.
On occasion the CLA Champion would face the NCLA Champion at the end of the season to determine a conference or "California State Champion".  UCSB captured the final state championship played under this arrangement defeating their northern counterparts in 1978. In 1979, at the urging of CLA VP and San Diego State alum Mitch Fenton, a separate organization for the collegiate teams in both the CLA and NCLA was brainstormed.

California Collegiate Lacrosse Association Era (1980-1982) 
The union that would eventually become the WCLL was founded on Super Bowl Sunday, January 20, 1980, as the California Collegiate Lacrosse Association (CCLA).  A select few gathered at the house of then UCLA Head Coach Mayer Davidson's house in West Los Angeles.  Co-founders also included Stanford Head Coach Sam Sadtler, the Claremont Head Coach and Mitch Fenton.  The original 9 members were: California, Claremont, San Diego State, Santa Clara, Southern California, Stanford, UC Davis, UCLA and UCSB.  Fenton served as the first president of the association.  In the inaugural championship, the UCSB Gauchos defeated the Stanford Cardinal. One year later, Whittier College joined the league. In 1982, the University of Arizona, Arizona State and Northern Arizona joined the CCLA.  That same year the Stanford Cardinal took home the championship defeating UCLA at Stanford.

WCLL Expansion Era (1982-2008) 
In 1983, the CCLA renamed itself the Western Collegiate Lacrosse League.  That same year Cal Poly SLO joined the conference.  Arizona Head Coach and WCLL co-founder Mickey-Miles Felton, who was instrumental in the addition of the Arizona schools the year before, served as the league's first president.  The WCLL Championship Trophy is named in his honor.

In 1985, Loyola Marymount University was admitted to the conference. In 1987, Chico State was admitted as a full member of the conference.

In 1988, the WCLL split into A and B divisions (later I and II).  That same year Chapman University and San Jose State University joined the WCLL as Division II members. In 1989, Sonoma State joined the WCLL.

In 1997, the WCLL, was one of the charter conferences in the US Lacrosse Intercollegiate Associates (USLIA). Prior to the 2000 season, Whittier College departed joining the NCAA Division III as an independent. Following the 2002 season, Division II member Cal State San Marcos left the conference.  Following the 2004 season, Division II member Cal State Hayward (now Cal State East Bay) left the conference.

The addition of the University of Nevada, Reno and St. Mary's College to the WCLL Division I at the annual conference meeting in 2004 lead to a massive realignment of the conference.  The 20 Division I teams were split into 4 geographic divisions (North, Central, Los Angeles and South) for the 2005 season. In 2005, the University of Nevada, Las Vegas and UC Santa Cruz joined the league, followed by Cal State Fullerton and the readmittance of San Jose State in 2006. That same year, the USLIA reorganized into the Men's Collegiate Lacrosse Association (MCLA).

Departure of Southern Teams (2009) 
The league grew into the largest MCLA conferences but saw big changes in 2009. The University of California, Merced joined the league for the 2009 season but the league lost its entire Central Division, made up of Chapman, UC Santa Barbara, Claremont, Loyola Marymount, USC, and UCLA; and lost the majority of its Southern Division, including: Arizona State, San Diego State, Arizona, San Diego, UC San Diego. The WCLL also lost six of ten Division II members, including: Biola, Cal Lutheran, Cal State Fullerton, Occidental, Pepperdine, UC Irvine, and UNLV. The departing teams formed the Southwestern Lacrosse Conference (SLC).

Modern Era (2009-Present) 
After the departure of its southern teams, the WCLL entered a period which would see several teams join, only to cease operations shortly thereafter. This included UC Merced (2009-2012), Cal-State Monterey Bay (2013-2014), the University of San Francisco (2015-2016), and culminated in the of one of the league's oldest members, University of the Pacific, folding in 2017.

In 2014, Sierra Nevada College joined the conference, they would go on to win four back-to-back division II championships from 2015 to 2018. The team ultimately folded in 2022 after their school was sold to the University of Nevada at Reno, which closed all of its sports teams.

In 2020, UC Santa Barbara returned to the WCLL after 11 years (2009-2019) in the SLC. 

In 2023, the WCLL expanded to include its first team from Oregon, Southern Oregon University, moving over from the Pacific Northwest Collegiate Lacrosse League (PNCLL).

Teams

Former members

Conference championship

Division I
When the conference was formed in 1980, it was determined that the top team of the Northern Division would play the top team of the Southern Division at the end of the season to determine the conference champion. This changed in 1985 when the conference championship was turned into a four team tournament among the top two teams in each division. The 2005 season introduced two new divisions to the WCLL, the Central Division and the Los Angeles Division, each of whom would send their top two teams to tournament. After many teams left in 2009, the conference dissolved all of its divisions and changed the tournament to be among the conference's top four teams. In 2019, the conference reintroduced its North Division and South Division, the champions of which would receive a bye round in a six-team tournament.

 Note: Bold text denotes MCLA National Champion
 Note: Italic text denotes MCLA National Champion runner-up

Division II

*Despite winning the championship game, Biola were made to forfeit the title because they fielded ineligible players

 Note: Bold text denotes MCLA National Champion

References

External links
 Western Collegiate Lacrosse League website
 MCLA website

College lacrosse leagues in the United States